Legislative elections were held in New Caledonia on 11 May 2014. The result was a victory for the three anti-independence parties (Caledonia Together, Front for Unity and Union for Caledonia in France), which together won 29 of the 54 seats (48.85% of the votes, 53.7% of the seats) in the Congress of New Caledonia.

Electoral system
Voters elected 87 members to the assemblies of the three provinces of New Caledonia. In turn, 54 also become members of the Congress. Voting was restricted to people on the Special Roll, which excluded people who moved to New Caledonia after 1988.

A total of 17 parties registered to contest the elections.

Campaign
The main issue at stake in the elections was independence from France. The elected Congress would be responsible for taking decisions on moving towards independence, as agreed in the Nouméa Accord, and an independence referendum will be held during the term of this Congress if there is a three-fifths majority in favour of holding one. However, in the lead up to the elections, the pro-independence Kanak and Socialist National Liberation Front claimed that around 6,700 people on the Special Roll had moved to New Caledonia after 1988, and that 2,000 people who should have been on the Special Roll and were eligible to vote in the Territorial elections were not, the two figures equating to around 7% of registered voters. In response, anti-independence groups claimed that 4,000 Kanaks should be removed from the electoral roll, and that taking the issue to court would threaten a return to violence.

A television debate was planned to discuss the electoral roll issue, but was cancelled at the last minute. The United Nations sent a delegation to the territory in March 2014 to look into the controversy around the electoral lists, and to ensure that the Accords were upheld. Although the French government approved the UN delegation, the anti-independence Union for New Caledonia within France and Caledonia Together opposed their presence.

Results

References

New Caledonia
New Caledonia
Legislative
Elections in New Caledonia
New Caledonia